Fenchuganj Combined Cycle Power Plant or Fenchuganj Combined Cycle Gas also known as Fenchuganj Power Plant is a gas-turbine and steam turbine based power station in Fenchuganj Upazila, Sylhet District of Bangladesh. This station is governed by Bangladesh Power Development Board.

Geography
It is situated on the west side of Jetighat beside Sylhet-Moulvibazar Road. It stands on 2 km west of the Fenchuganj Bridge comprising a land of 33.5 acres on the bank of Kushiyara River.

History
Fenchuganj power  plant  was  built  in  1994  with a capacity  of 90 MW. It started operation with two gas turbine generators ( each of 30 MW) and a steam turbine (30 MW) respectively. It is also called Fenchuganj 90 MW power plant as it supplied 90 MW from the beginning. This Power Plant is the first ever combined cycle power station in the country.

See also

Electricity sector in Bangladesh
Energy policy of Bangladesh
List of power stations in Bangladesh

References 

Economy of Sylhet
Fossil fuel power stations in Bangladesh
Energy in Bangladesh
Electric power in Bangladesh
Power stations in Bangladesh
1994 establishments in Bangladesh
Sylhet District
Natural gas-fired power stations in Bangladesh